The Sri Lanka Scout Association ( Shri Lanka Baladaksha Sangamaya), is a Scouting organization in Sri Lanka operated by the Ceylon Scout Council. The Ceylon Scout Council is a corporation formed by Act No 13 of 1957. The association became a member of the World Organization of the Scout Movement in 1953.  The coeducational Sri Lanka Scout Association has 33,709 members as of 2014. in 2016 the year that the National Organisation reached 104 years the Scouting Population in Sri Lanka had increased to 55,078 the growth taking place against the year 2015 was 29% which was a great achievement by the SLSA.

There are various community development projects carried out in cooperation with the government organizations, United Nations and other service organisations.

Scouting has been introduced into the prisons. It has spread to other institutions such as certified schools. There are also Scout units for handicapped boys such as the blind and deaf and for boys in leprosy hospitals.

History

 1912 - In 1912, the first recorded troop of Boy Scouts in Sri Lanka was formed at Christ Church College, Matale by District Civil Engineer, Francis George Stevens.
 1913 - The second Scout troop in the country, the 1st Kandy Dharmaraja Scout Group, was established at Dharmaraja College, Kandy
 1914 - (14 June) the first Colombo (Governor's Own) Scout troop was established. It was the first open Scout troop and the third Scout troop in Sri Lanka
 1914 - The 1st Galle Mahinda Scout Group, was established at Mahinda College, Galle by Francis George Stevens
 1914 - Scouting was introduced to Trinity College, Kandy by J. N. Thomas.
 1916 - Creation of the 10th Colombo Ananda College Scout Troop at Ananda College, Colombo 
1916 - Creation of the 4th Galle Aloysius' Scout Group at St. Aloysius' College, Galle by Fr. Murphy
 1916 - Western Province Rally at Havelock Park, Colombo.
 1917 - Scouting was introduced to Wesley College, Colombo by Rev. P. T. Cash,
 1916 - The Boy Scouts Association of the United Kingdom formed its Ceylon Branch.
 1917 - King's Flag (awarded by His Majesty the King George V) was won by 1st Kandy Dharmaraja Scouts for the first time in Ceylon Scouting history.
 1917 - First all Ceylon Rally at Havelock Race Course, Colombo.
 1917 - A. B. Rambukwella of the 1st Kandy Dharmaraja Scout Group, won the King's Scout Badge as the first Ceylonese King Scout.
 1918 - King's Flag (awarded by His Majesty the King George V) was won by 1st Kandy Dharmaraja Scouts for the second time in Ceylon Scouting history.
 1919 - King's Flag (awarded by His Majesty the King George V) was won by 1st Kandy Dharmaraja Scouts for the third time in Ceylon Scouting history.
 1921 - 1921 - B.P.'s visit to Sri Lanka with Lady Olave Baden-Powell; Scouting started in Prisons.
 1925 - Vernon Grenier becomes Chief Commissioner.
 1930 - Scout HQ moves to an old guardroom at Galle Face, Colombo.
 1930 - J.H. De Saram become the first native Chief Commissioner.
 1932 - All Ceylon Scout Craft exhibition at Katugastota, Kandy. 
 1934 - Lord and Lady Baden-Powell visit Sri Lanka
 1942 - K. Somasundaram becomes Chief Commissioner.
 1948 - Col. C.P. Jayawardene becomes the Chief Commissioner. New Buildings of National Headquarters. Pedru Camp-site at Nuwera-Eliya. Job Week scheme started. Sinhala and Tamil edition of Scouting for Boys published.
 1952 - Ceylon Jamboree at Koombi Kele, Colombo. (near the present BMICH, Colombo.)
 1953 - The Boy Scouts Association Ceylon Branch is succeeded by the Ceylon Boy Scouts Association.
 1954 - E. W. Kannangara becomes Chief Commissioner.
 1957 - Participation in Jubilee Jamboree in England.
 1957 - Ceylon Boy Scouts Council (Incorporation) Act passed by the parliament nationalising the former Ceylon branch of The Boy Scouts Association of the United Kingdom under the control of the Ceylon Boy Scouts Council.
 1962 - Golden Jubilee Jamboree at Race Course, Colombo.
 1965 - 25 November - 'Cub Scout Tattoo' a Unique Performance in Police ground.
 1965 - Mr.Vincent Perera, a Mayor Of Colombo renamed the Lower lake road to "BALADAKSHA MAWATHA"
 1965 - "BALADAKSHA HANDA" Special Sinhala Radio Program Started with SLBC.
 1966 - The Cub Scout Golden Jubilee Celebrations in Sri Lanka and World.
 1967 - Fitzroy H. Gunesekera becomes Chief Commissioner.
 1967 - Creation of the 32nd Colombo Nalanda College Scout Troop at Nalanda College, Colombo
 1972 - C.M.P. Wanigatunga becomes Chief Commissioner.
 1977 - H. Ratnasuriya becomes Chief Commissioner. National HQ shifted to Chitthampalan Gardiner Mawatha, Colombo 02.
 1978 - Old Rajans Scouts Association (ORSA), the first South Asian old Scout association formed by the old Scouts of 1st Kandy Dharmaraja Scout Group, Dharmaraja College, Kandy.
 1982 - Theodore Seneviratne becomes Chief Commissioner. Special Commemorative Stamp in honour of B.P. on 125th Birth Anniversary.
 1983 - 3rd National Jamboree at Walisinghe Harischandra Ground Anuradhapura.
 1984 - 2nd National Cubboree.
 1987 - Rex Jayasinha becomes Chief Commissioner.
 1990 - 1st SAARC Jamboree at Vihara Maha Devi Park, Colombo. Chief Commissioner Rex Jayasinha dies just before Jamboree. J. Lionel Silva becomes Chief Commissioner.
 1992 - 4th National Jamboree in Kurunegala. M. Mazzahim Mohideen becomes Chief Commissioner.
 1997 - K.H. Camillus Fernando becomes Chief Commissioner.
 1998 - 5th National Jamboree, Pallekelle, Kandy.
 1998 - First Asia- Pacific Workshop on Information Technology - Colombo, First Web page hosted by University of Morotuwa.
 2002 - H.S. Weerakoon becomes Chief Commissioner. 6th National Scout Jamboree, Balapitiya.
 2006 - 7th National Scout Jamboree, Nuwara Eliya.
 2007 - C. Batuwangala becomes Chief Commissioner.
 2009 - First female Cub Scouts invested on 23 January
 2009 - Chathura Deshapriya Mataraarachchi of 1st Kandy Dharmaraja Scout Group was awarded the Outstanding Asia-Pacific Scout Award. 
 2009 - The initiation of Sri Lanka Old Scouts and Old Guides Association and the Kandy District President Scouts and President Guides Association was done
 2010  - 8th National Scout Jamboree, Angunakolapelessa.
 2011  - Sri Lankan First Equestrian Scouts are invested, Premadasa Riding School collaboration with SLEA at Nugegoda. Sri Lanka is the first country to introduce Equestrian Scouting to the Scouting agenda in the Asia Pacific Region.
 2012 The Sri Lanka Scout Association celebrated 100 years of Scouting in Sri Lanka, organised a centenary Scout walk, issued a new stamp and a Rs.2/= coin and were host of the Asia-Pacific Scout Jamboree at Gam Udawa & Kandalama sites Dambulla, Matale District in the Central Province of Sri Lanka from 31 March to 7 April 2012 with approximately 8,000 Scouts including overseas participants from 23 countries.
 2012 February 22 - published New Scouting Magazine Scouting Magazine - Sri Lanka for Sri Lankan scouts.
 2012  - 29th APR and Sri Lanka Centenary Scout Jamboree, Dambulla.
 2012 - Sidath Chandima Gajanayaka was awarded the Outstanding Asia-Pacific Scout Award.
 2012 - Prof. Nimal De Silva becomes Chief Commissioner on 19 April 2012.
 2013 - 1st Kandy Dharmaraja Scout Group together with Old Rajans Scouts Association held the Rajans International Scout Gathering of Centennial 2013 (RISGO 2013) at Lake View Park International Scout Centre to celebrate centennial year of the group with Scouts representing all Scouting regions of the world from 30 countries.
 2013 - 10th National Cubboree, St. Anthony's College, Wattala. Sri Lanka.
 2013 - 17th Kandy Trinity College Scout Group organised and held "Around Sri Lanka in 12 Days" Bicycle Ride as a prelude of their centenary to be celebrated in 2014 as the Scouts rode around the Coastal belt of the country covering more than 1600 km. They also raised funds for the New Cancer Hospital to be built in Kandy as well as created awareness on cancer throughout their ride.
 2014 - 8th Asia-Pacific Scout Leaders Summit 2014 at Goldi Sands Hotel Ethukala, Negombo.
 2014 - 1st Kandy Dharmaraja Scout Group established a Guinness World Records by creating the World Largest neckerchief and woggle.
 2014 - Colombo Centenary International Scout Jamboree (CCISJ 2014) 1 to 7 August 2014 at Ygro Campsite, Madampe.
 2014 - 7 October, opening a new chapter in Sri Lankan Scouting for (age 5 ½ to 7) සිඟිති බාලදක්ෂ 'Kids Scouting'.
 20 May 2015 - Sri Lanka's President Maithreepala Sirisena took Oaths as Chief Scout of Sri Lanka and Patron of the Guild
 2016  - 9th National Scout Jamboree, Jaffna.
 2016 – 100 years of Cub Scouting in Sri Lanka and World
 13 May 2016 - 11th National Cubboree, Richmond College, Galle, Sri Lanka.
 2017 - Mr. Meril Gunatilaka becomes Chief Commissioner.
 17 Aug 2017 - Deputy Chief Commissioner Mr. Janaprith Salinda Fernando elected to World Scout Committee member for the term 2017- 2020
 2020 - Major General Milinda Peiris becomes Chief Commissioner on 13 January 2020.
 17 Jan 2020 - Sri Lanka's President Gotabaya takes oath as Chief Scout of Sri Lanka.
 3–5 April 2020 - special edition of #JOTI, engaged in online WOSM with commitment to keep Scouting active, even in COVID'19 Pandemic times.

All Ceylon Rally
 1st All Ceylon Rally, Havelock Race Course, Colombo, 1917
 2nd All Ceylon Rally, Barracks, Kandy, 1918
 3rd All Ceylon Rally, Kandy, 1919
 4th All Ceylon Rally, Havelock Race Course, Colombo, 1921 (Lord & Lady BP Arrivals)
 5th All Ceylon Rally, Kandy, 1922 (Eastern tour of the Prince of Wales 23 March 1922)
 6th All Ceylon Rally, Colombo, 1924 (Farewell Ceremony of The British Governor William Manning)

National Scout Jamboree
National Jamboree is organised by National HQ.

 1st National Scout Jamboree, Bullers Road, Colombo, 1952
 2nd National Scout Jamboree, Havelock Race Course, Colombo, 1962
 3rd National Scout Jamboree, Harischandra Ground, Anuradhapura - 26 February to 4 March 1983
 4th National Scout Jamboree, Welagedara Ground, Kurunegala, 1992
 5th National Scout Jamboree, Kandy, 1998
 6th National Scout Jamboree, Balapitiya, 2002
 7th National Scout Jamboree, Nuwara Eliya, 2006
 8th National Scout Jamboree, Angunakolapelessa, 2010
 9th National Scout Jamboree, Jaffna, 20 to 26 February 2016
 10th National Scout Jamboree 2020 Trincomalee

Notable Scouters

 Gerald Fernando served as the International Boy Scout Commissioner for the Far East in the 1950s until his death in 1961.
 Senator E. W. Kannangara served on the World Scout Committee of the World Organization of the Scout Movement from 1960 until 1961.
 In 1973, Kingsley C. Dassanaike was awarded the Bronze Wolf, the only distinction of the World Organization of the Scout Movement, awarded by the World Scout Committee for exceptional services to world Scouting.
 Janaprith Fernando was the first Sri Lankan elected to the World Scout Committee, the highest governing body of World Organization of the Scout Movement. He will serve as a member of this committee till 2020.

Programme sections
Programme Commissioner of Sri Lanka Scout Association is Sarath Mataraarachchi (2019 - 2024)

5 Years 6 Months to 7 Years - Singithi Scouts
7 Years to 11 years  - Cubs Scouts
10 Years and 6 Months  to 14 Years and 6 Months - Junior Scout
14 Years 6 Months to 18 Years - Senior Scouts
17 Years and 6 Months to 24 Years - Rover Scout

Rover Scouts

Youth between the Age 17 and 26 years are eligible to be trained as Rover Scouts.

A Rover Scout working for the B.P. Award must maintain a Record Book (not his personal Log Book) from the date he was invested as a Rover Scout for a minimum of 2 years.

In the first half of the book he will record every Crew Meeting he attended and every C-I-C he was present at. He will give the date of the meetings, their duration, and the important events of the programme. He should have attended a minimum of 24 Crew Meetings and 6 C-I-C meetings, to be eligible for the B.P. Award.

Special sections
Air Scouting and Sea Scouting are different ways of delivering the programme, and are not separate organisations. They are based on the same fundamental Scouting Aims & Methods. Sea and Air Scouts follow the core balanced programme for their section but usually add a nautical or aeronautical twist to the programme and activities.

Sea Scouting 
Sea Scouts in Sri Lanka was originally established in 1932. Sri Lanka Scout Association is about to officially relaunch the Sea Scouts. The Sri Lanka Navy would be providing all the technical facilities and some of the training. Captain Suresh De Silva a former President's Scout, who is now the Headquarters Commissioner for Sea Scouts is in charge of the operations. There was already a two-day orientation course for prospective Leaders and a one-day practical course for the Scouts.

Air Scouting 
Sri Lanka Air force is the pioneer of Air Scouting in Sri Lanka. The First Air Scout troop 57th Colombo was started in 1972 by Sri Lanka Air Force with the direction of then Commander of the Air Force Air Chief Marshal Padi Mendis and first Group Scout Leader Wing Commander PT Silva. At present  Sri Lanka Air Force Air Scout group has more than 1,500 Air Scouts organised in 10 Air Scouts Troops. First Sri Lanka Air Rover crew started in 2017 with 15 Air Rovers at Sri Lanka Air Force Base Rathmalana.  

Air Scouts are being trained on aviation and flying-based activities with the support of Sri Lanka Air Force. In addition, Air Scouts follow the same Scouting activities and badge schemes as normal Scouts, Further, Air Scouts undergo aeronautical and technical training of aircraft, Design Model Aircraft, Design UAVs, Design quadrocopters, Air Cargo Operation, Aircraft under wing operation and Airport management. Air Scouts have different uniform as Air Scouts in other countries. 

There are claims that Major Baden Fletcher Smyth Baden–Powell, youngest brother of the founder of BP, Late Lieutenant General Robert Baden–Powell and an aviator, first brought flying-based activities into Scouting. However, as late as July, 1932, Baden Baden-Powell wrote: 

"…it has been suggested that Air Scouts should be organized in the same way as Sea Scouts."

Chairman of Sri Lanka Air Force Air Scouts - Group Captain Paminda Jayawardhana
Deputy Chairman of Sri Lanka Air Force Air Scouts - Group Captain Sujeeva Ponnamperuma 
Secretary of Sri Lanka Air Force Air Scouts - Wing Commander Dr.Rajeev Pagoda

Scout training camps

Pedro Scout Training Camp near Nuwara Eliya is known for its tropical forests and hills.

Lee Dassanayake Scout Activity Center near Mirigama is set in 12 acres of forest in the Gampaha District. The site offers camping facilities, woodland and campsite activities, hiking tracks and a large rally ground.

Lake View Park International Scout Centre in Kandy is a 57-acre ground belonging to Dharmaraja College. The park is modeled after Gilwell Park in London. It consists of rally grounds, camp sites, campfire circle, the den, kitchen complex, lecture rooms and dormitories. It is the home for the 1st Kandy Dharmaraja Scout Group.

Structure 
The Sri Lanka Scout Association is structured in seven Scouting provinces with 37 districts:
 Northern Province
 Central Province
 Eastern Province 
 North Western Province
 Western Province 
 Uva Province
 Sabaragamuwa Province   
·        Ampara

·        Akkaraipaththu-Kalmunai

·        Colombo

·        Batticaloa

·        Homagama

·        Kankesanthurei

·        Kurunagala

·        Matale

·        Negombo

·        Nuwara-Eliya

·        Rathnapura

·        Point-Pedro

·        Anuradapura

·        Badulla

·        Gampaha

·        Hambantota

·        Kandy

·        Kegalle

·        Matara

·        Moratuwa-Piliyandala

·        Mulativu

·        Panadura-Horana

·        Trincomalee

·        Vavuniya

·        Wenappuwa

·        Avissawella

·        Chilaw

·        Galle

·        Jaffna

·        Kalutara

·        Kilinochchi

·        Monaragala

·        Nawalapitiya

·        Mannar

·        Polonnaruwa

·        Puththalam

·        Waththala-Jaela

Scouting Magazine Sri Lanka 

Scouting Magazine Sri Lanka is a publication of the Scouts Media Network of Sri Lanka. The target audience is membership of both genders at all age levels. It carries news on Scouting events, articles on aspects of Scouting such as service, outdoor skills and activities, and features about Scouting activities. It has been in publication since 22 February 2012.

See also 
The Sri Lanka Girl Guides Association
World Buddhist Scout Brotherhood
Lake View Park International Scout Centre

References

External links
Sri Lanka Scout Association
Scouting Magazine - Sri Lanka 

World Organization of the Scout Movement member organizations
Youth organisations based in Sri Lanka
Scouting and Guiding in Sri Lanka
Youth organizations established in 1912
Youth organizations established in 1957
1912 establishments in Ceylon